Thorsten Mauritsen (born 1977) is a Danish climate scientist.  He is currently a  professor at the Department of Meteorology at Stockholm University. His research interests include climate dynamics and global circulation, climate sensitivity and cloud feedbacks and ocean-atmosphere coupled problems. He is best known for his research on Earth's equilibrium climate sensitivity and his research uses the climate of the past to determine climate sensitivity more precisely.

Biography

He was born in Sønderborg and studied physics and meteorology at the University of Copenhagen and Stockholm University. He received his PhD in Stockholm in 2007. He then joined MPI-M as a postdoctoral researcher, and eventually became a group leader at the institute.

He has been cited around 10,000 times. His h-index is 44 as of 2021.

References

External links 

Danish climatologists
Academic staff of Stockholm University
Stockholm University alumni
University of Copenhagen alumni
People from Sønderborg Municipality
1977 births
Living people